The 1941 Delaware State Hornets football team represented the State College for Colored Students—now known as Delaware State University—in the 1941 college football season as an independent.

Schedule

References

Delaware State
Delaware State Hornets football seasons
Delaware State Hornets football